Ronald A. Cohen (born July 13, 1955) is an American neuropsychologist.

Cohen earned his bachelor's degree in psychology from Tulane University and a Ph.D. from Louisiana State University. He began teaching at the University of Massachusetts Medical School in 1983. In 1993, Cohen joined the faculty of Brown University, teaching at the Alpert Medical School. He moved to the University of Florida in 2012, and was appointed Evelyn F. McKnight chair for clinical translational research in cognitive aging and memory in 2015.

References

External links
Ronald A. Cohen at the University of Florida

1955 births
Living people
Brown University faculty
University of Florida faculty
University of Massachusetts faculty
Tulane University alumni
Louisiana State University alumni
21st-century American psychologists
Neuropsychologists
20th-century American psychologists